Zernyia is a monotypic moth genus in the family Geometridae erected by Louis Beethoven Prout in 1929. Its only species, Zernyia granataria, described by Otto Staudinger in 1871, is found in Spain.

References

Boarmiini